The King County Prosecuting Attorney is a non-partisan elected official in King County, Washington. The Prosecuting Attorney leads the King County Prosecuting Attorney's Office, and prosecutes all felonies (as well as all misdemeanors in unincorporated areas, and those brought by state law enforcement agencies) that occur within King County, Washington. Since 2023, the position has been held by Leesa Manion, the former deputy county prosecutor.

Departmental organization

The Prosecuting Attorney's Office is located in the King County Courthouse (in downtown Seattle, Washington) and consists of 210 deputy prosecuting attorneys and 190 administrative staff members. The Office prosecuted 6,135 felonies in 2012, about 40% of which were violent crimes. Employees are spread across three divisions:
 Criminal: Appellate Unit, Car Theft Initiative, District Court Unit, Domestic Violence Unit, Drug Case Development, Drug Court, Economic Crimes Unit, Involuntary Treatment Act, Juvenile Court Unit, Most Dangerous Offender Project, Records and Information Section, Repeat Burglar Initiative, Sentencing Unit, Sexually Violent Predator Unit, Special Assault Unit, Violent Crimes Unit
 Civil: serving as chief legal counsel and litigator for the County
 Family Support: establishes paternity, enforces support obligations, etc.

Partial list of Prosecuting Attorneys
Warren Magnuson, 1935–1937
Lloyd W. Shorett, 1943–1949
Chuck Carroll, 1949–1971
Chris Bayley, 1971–1979
Norm Maleng, 1979–2007
Dan Satterberg, 2007–2023
Leesa Manion, 2023–present

See also
 Allegheny County District Attorney
 Baltimore County State's Attorney
 Dallas County District Attorney
 Denver District Attorney's Office
 District Attorney of Philadelphia
 Los Angeles County District Attorney
 Milwaukee County District Attorney
 New York County District Attorney
 San Diego County District Attorney
 San Francisco District Attorney's Office

References 

District attorneys
Government of King County, Washington